Robert Erskine was a Scottish inventor.

Robert Erskine may refer to:
Robert Erskine (doctor) (1677–1718), advisor to Peter the Great
Robert Erskine (1735–1780), Scottish inventor
Robert St Clair-Erskine, 4th Earl of Rosslyn (1833–1890), Scottish Conservative politician
Robert Erskine (coach), American college football and basketball coach, 1920s and '30s
Robert Erskine (politician) (1905–1982), Australian politician
Sir Robert Erskine-Hill, 2nd Baronet (1917–1989), of the Erskine-Hill baronets
Two 15th/16th-century Lords Erskine

See also

Erskine (surname)